Angel M. Marchand (1 June 1912 in Barceloneta, Puerto Rico – 19 February 2005 in San Juan, Puerto Rico) was a Puerto Rican allergy researcher and clinician.

Educated at Case Western Reserve University School of Medicine, where he obtained his M.D. in 1935, after obtaining his B.A. in 1931 at Miami University in Hamilton, Ohio, he was one of Puerto Rico's first board-certified allergist and immunologists.  Active in the American College of Chest Physicians, Marchand served as a Regent of the organization in 1951–52.

His constant research and extensive practice in allergy and immunology in Santurce, Puerto Rico allowed him to develop multiple vaccines to cure or prevent many allergies prevalent in tropical climates. This dedication resulted in an International Distinguished Fellowship Award from The American College of Allergy, Asthma & Immunology.

A prominent member of the Popular Democratic Party of Puerto Rico, his list of patients included Governor Luis Muñoz Marín, First Lady Inés Mendoza and future Senate President and Secretary of State Kenneth McClintock.

Marchand participated regularly in regional, hemispheric and international shooting competitions, including the 1968 Summer Olympics, where he was Puerto Rico's second oldest athlete, at the age of 56. He finished in 53rd place in the trap event.

See also
List of Puerto Ricans
Puerto Rican scientists and inventors

References

External links
In memoriam - casemed.case.edu

1912 births
2005 deaths
Case Western Reserve University School of Medicine alumni
Miami University alumni
People from Barceloneta, Puerto Rico
Puerto Rican immunologists
Puerto Rican male sport shooters
Olympic shooters of Puerto Rico
Shooters at the 1968 Summer Olympics